Michał Zapaśnik (born 19 July 1988 in Otwock) is a Polish footballer who currently plays for Znicz Pruszków.

Career
In the winter 2010, he was loaned to Dolcan Ząbki again from Zagłębie Lubin.
In the summer 2010, he left Zagłębie Lubin for Dolcan Ząbki.

References

External links
 

1988 births
Living people
Polish footballers
Zagłębie Lubin players
Ząbkovia Ząbki players
People from Otwock
Sportspeople from Masovian Voivodeship
Association football forwards